Lee Rupp (born c. 1938) is a retired American conservationist and politician.

Rupp is a native of Monroe, Nebraska. He spent much of his free time hunting and fishing alone, as his father did farm work in northeast Nebraska. Rupp started his career with the Nebraska Game and Parks Commission in 1972, serving as a district manager and fisheries biologist, as well as a guide for the Grand National Mixed Hunt. He left the NGPC after eleven years and was elected to the Nebraska Legislature from district 22 throughout the 1980s. During his tenure as a state legislator, Rupp advocated for bills regarding fish, wildlife and conservation. Rupp was succeeded in office by Jennie Robak, and subsequently worked for the University of Nebraska-Lincoln as a lobbyist until 1997, when he was replaced by Ron Withem. In 2021, the NGPC renamed the Looking Glass Wildlife Management Area near Rupp's hometown to the Lee Rupp Wildlife Management Area in his honor.

References

1930s births
Living people
People from Platte County, Nebraska
20th-century American biologists
Scientists from Nebraska
20th-century American politicians
American conservationists
University of Nebraska–Lincoln people
American lobbyists